New Republic Pictures is an American production company and independent financier of feature films founded by Brian Oliver in 2017.

History 
Through partnerships with major studios and foreign sales companies, New Republic brings outstanding commercial motion pictures from distinguished filmmakers to theaters worldwide. Their first film was the Elton John biopic, Rocketman (2019), which was followed by 1917 (2019).
 
Since May 2018, New Republic has struck a first-look co-financing and distribution deal with Paramount Pictures, where the studio's four-year pact would kick off with Elton John musical Rocketman to star Taron Egerton, which Paramount will distribute worldwide and went into production on 2 August 2018. In December 2019, Bradley J. Fischer has been tapped as president and Chief Content Officer of New Republic Pictures, whom him and Oliver will produce all New Republic film, TV and streaming projects.
 
In June 2020, Cate Blanchett and her Dirty Films company signed a deal with the studio. This was followed up by a deal with Jake Gyllenhaal and his Nine Stories Productions company on August 4.
 
In August 2020, New Republic signed a co-financing deal for 10 films with Paramount Pictures.

In November 2021, New Republic signed a development deal with Providence Film Group, who will be a subsidiary of New Republic and joint-produce films.

Films
This is the list of films produced or financed by New Republic.

References

External links
 
 

American film studios